Almost Perfect is a young adult novel by Brian Katcher, published October 13, 2009 by Delacorte Books for Young Readers.

The book follows Logan, a high-school senior, who, after discovering his girlfriend cheated on him, befriends the new student, Sage. Logan gradually develops romantic feelings for Sage until she informs him she's transgender. Logan must then work through complicated feelings regarding his attraction to Sage.

Reception

Reviews 
Almost Perfect received starred reviews from Kirkus, as well as a positive review from Booklist.

Kirkus Reviews applauded the book for tackling "issues of homophobia, hate crimes and stereotyping with humor and grace in an accessible tone that will resonate with teens." Booklist echoed the sentiment, stating, "Teens—both those familiar with transgender issues and those who are not—will welcome the honest take on a rarely explored subject."

Accolades

Censorship 
In a report conducted by the American Library Association’s Office for Intellectual Freedom, Almost Perfect was named the 81st-most banned and challenged book in the United States between 2010 and 2019.

In 2022, Almost Perfect was listed among 52 books banned by the Alpine School District following the implementation of Utah law H.B. 374, “Sensitive Materials In Schools," 42% of which “feature LBGTQ+ characters and or themes.” Many of the books were removed because they were considered to contain pornographic material according to the new law, which defines porn using the following criteria:

 "The average person" would find that the material, on the whole, "appeals to prurient interest in sex"
 The material "is patently offensive in the description or depiction of nudity, sexual conduct, sexual excitement, sadomasochistic abuse, or excretion"
 The material, on the whole, "does not have serious literary, artistic, political or scientific value."

References 

2009 children's books
Delacorte Press books
2000s LGBT novels
Novels with transgender themes
Novels set in Missouri
Stonewall Book Award-winning works
Censored books
Censorship of LGBT issues
2009 LGBT-related literary works